Major-General Sir Wilkinson Dent Bird,  (4 May 1869 – 6 January 1943) was an officer of the British Army during the late-19th century and the First World War.

Early career

Dent was born in 1869, the son of J.D. Bird, a captain in the 20th Hussars. After studying at Wellington and the Royal Military College, Sandhurst, he took a commission as a second lieutenant in the Queen's Royal Regiment on 22 August 1888. He was promoted to lieutenant on 1 December 1890, and to captain on 21 April 1897. That year, he served with the Niger Expedition, where he was mentioned in despatches and received a brevet promotion to major on 6 June 1897. His next posting took him to the North-Western Frontier of India.

He served with his regiment in the Second Boer War, where he was present at the Relief of Mafeking and was again mentioned in despatches, but was severely wounded and returned home in 1900. For his service, he was awarded the Distinguished Service Order (DSO).

Staff duties and regimental command

He was back as a regular captain in his regiment in July 1902. From 1903 to 1905 he was chief instructor at the School of Musketry, and from 1905 to 1909 a lecturer at the Staff College, India. He was promoted to a brevet lieutenant-colonelcy in 1909, and appointed a General Staff Officer, Grade 2, at the War Office the following year.

In 1913 he was transferred to command the 2nd Battalion, Royal Irish Rifles, and promoted to Colonel. He was in command of the battalion at the outbreak of the First World War in 1914, when it was sent to France with 7th Brigade, 3rd Division. On 26 August, at the Battle of Le Cateau, he assumed command of the 7th Brigade when its commander, Brigadier McCracken, was disabled by an artillery shell.

He was severely wounded at the First Battle of the Aisne, on 15 September; his leg had to be amputated as a result, and on recovery he returned to the general staff rather than regimental service. He was made a General Staff Officer, Grade 1 in 1915, and appointed Director of Staff Duties in 1916. In 1918, he took up the post of lieutenant-governor of the Royal Hospital, Chelsea, and retired in 1923, having received a promotion to major-general in 1921.
He was appointed the Lees Knowles Lecturer at Trinity College, Cambridge for the year 1927.

From 1929 to 1939, he served as the colonel of the Queen's Royal Regiment.

Family
Bird married Winifred Barker in early 1902; the couple had two daughters. The eldest daughter was born in Westminster on 1 January 1903.

Notes

References
History of the Great War: Military Operations, France and Belgium 1914, by J. E. Edmonds. Macmillan & Co., London, 1922. Digitised copy
"BIRD, Major-General Sir Wilkinson Dent". (2007). In Who Was Who. Online edition.

External links
 

1869 births
1943 deaths
Queen's Royal Regiment officers
Royal Ulster Rifles officers
British Army major generals
People educated at Wellington College, Berkshire
British Army personnel of the Second Boer War
Companions of the Distinguished Service Order
British Army generals of World War I
Knights Commander of the Order of the British Empire
Companions of the Order of St Michael and St George
Companions of the Order of the Bath
British amputees
Graduates of the Royal Military College, Sandhurst